South Side Railroad may refer to:
Southside Railroad (Virginia)
South Side Railroad of Long Island